The Opal Coast is a coastal region in northern France on the English Channel, popular with tourists.

Geography 

The Côte d'Opale is a coastal region in northeastern France, in the departments of Nord and Pas-de-Calais.

The Côte d'Opale is composed of many varied landscapes including beaches, dunes, swamps, estuaries and cliffs. These capes are the closest points to England on the entire French coast.

Cities 
 Boulogne-sur-Mer
 Calais
 Dunkerque

Famous seaside resorts 
From south to north:
 Berck
 Le Touquet-Paris-Plage
 Sainte-Cécile-Plage
 Hardelot-Plage
 Équihen-Plage
 Wimereux
 Audresselles
 Ambleteuse
 Wissant
 Blériot-Plage
 Bray-Dunes

Other communes of the coast 
From south to north:
 Merlimont
 Cucq
 Saint-Étienne-au-Mont
 Le Portel
 Audinghen
 Escalles
 Sangatte
 Marck
 Oye-Plage
 Grand-Fort-Philippe
 Gravelines
 Leffrinckoucke
 Zuydcoote

Arts 

Many artists have been inspired by the coast's landscapes, among them the composer Henri Dutilleux, the writers Victor Hugo and Charles Dickens, and the painters J. M. W. Turner, Carolus-Duran, Maurice Boitel and Eugène Boudin. It was the painter  who coined the name for this area in 1911 to describe the distinctive quality of its light.

See also
 Communauté d'agglomération du Boulonnais

References

External links
Travel Guide of the Opal Coast / Côte d'Opale
Accommodation on the Opal Coast / Côte d'Opale
Côte d'Opale through photos : You will love it !
Côte d'Opale : Tourism, shopping, B&B
Le Cap Blanc Nez
Le Cap Gris Nez
Le Grand Site des 2 Caps
Slipping on Côte d'Opale : B&b, Gîtes, Hôtels ...
 Tourism in Boulogne sur Mer and the Boulonnais area (in English)
Cape Blanc Nez
Cape Gris Nez

Landforms of the Pas-de-Calais
Cliffs of Metropolitan France
Tourist attractions in Hauts-de-France
Tourist attractions in Pas-de-Calais
Opale
Landforms of Hauts-de-France